Rosander is a Swedish surname.

Geographical distribution
As of 2014, 66.6% of all known bearers of the surname Rosander were residents of Sweden (frequency 1:6,260), 29.7% of the United States (1:514,603) and 2.1% of Norway (1:104,946).

In Sweden, the frequency of the surname was higher than national average (1:6,260) in the following counties:
 1. Kalmar County (1:1,970)
 2. Kronoberg County (1:3,137)
 3. Skåne County (1:3,991)
 4. Östergötland County (1:4,208)
 5. Halland County (1:4,432)
 6. Gotland County (1:4,499)
 7. Örebro County (1:4,456)
 8. Jönköping County (1:4,844)
 9. Blekinge County (1:5,498)
 10. Uppsala County (1:5,928)

People 
 Bertil T. Rosander (1912-2000), American politician and businessman
 Oscar Rosander (1901–1971), Swedish film editor
 Hans Rosander (1937–2016), Swedish footballer
 Hannah Widell (born 1975), née Rosander, Swedish television presenter

References

Swedish-language surnames